is a Japanese group rhythmic gymnast.

Career 
Yokota represented Japan at the 2015 World Rhythmic Gymnastics Championships where she won the bronze medal in the 5 ribbons event. and eventually competed alongside her teammates Airi Hatakeyama, Sakura Noshitani, Sayuri Sugimoto and Rie Matsubara at the 2016 Summer Olympics in Rio de Janeiro, finishing outside of medals in the group all-around final with an eight-place score of 34.200.

References

External links
 

1997 births
Living people
Japanese rhythmic gymnasts
Olympic gymnasts of Japan
People from Tokyo
Medalists at the Rhythmic Gymnastics World Championships
Gymnasts at the 2016 Summer Olympics
Gymnasts from Tokyo
21st-century Japanese women